Anne Lucia Cornelia Maria ("Anneloes") Nieuwenhuizen (born October 16, 1963 in Bussum) is a former Dutch field hockey defender, who won the gold medal with the National Women's Team at the 1984 Summer Olympics.

Four years later in Seoul she captured the bronze medal with the national side. From 1984 to 1989 she played a total number of 87 international matches for the Netherlands, in which she did not score.

References
 Dutch Hockey Federation

External links
 

1963 births
Living people
Dutch female field hockey players
Olympic field hockey players of the Netherlands
Field hockey players at the 1984 Summer Olympics
Field hockey players at the 1988 Summer Olympics
Olympic gold medalists for the Netherlands
Olympic bronze medalists for the Netherlands
People from Bussum
Olympic medalists in field hockey
Medalists at the 1988 Summer Olympics
Medalists at the 1984 Summer Olympics
20th-century Dutch women
21st-century Dutch women